Kılavuzlar, Sultanhisar is a village in the District of Sultanhisar, Aydın Province, Turkey. As of 2010 it had a population of 167 people.

References

Villages in Sultanhisar District